Kriesha Ziskind Teo Tiu (born December 20, 1998), better known by her stage name Kriesha Chu (Korean: 크리샤 츄), is a Filipina-American singer based in South Korea.

Life and career

Early life
Tiu was born on December 20, 1998, in Makati, Philippines to Filipino parents of Chinese heritage who relocated from Cebu to Manila. At the age of 2, Tiu migrated with her family to San Francisco. She then got scouted by her current company, Urban Works Entertainment.

She speaks English, Cebuano, Tagalog and Korean, and holds both Filipino and US citizenships.

2016–2017: K-pop Star 6: The Last Chance and Kriesha Chu 1st Single Album 
In 2016, Chu entered K-pop Star 6: The Last Chance. She was eliminated on the seventh episode, but was brought back as a wild card contestant. She became a member of Kwins, which consists of Kim So-hee and Kim Hye-rim, where they finished as runners-up of the competition. After K-pop Star 6 ended, Chu released her first single album on May 24, 2017.

2018–present: Dream of Paradise and soundtrack appearances 
On January 3, 2018, she released her first mini-album, Dream of Paradise, along with the title track "Like Paradise". The lead single is composed by the harmony team of Pentagon's Hui and Flow Blow. "Sunset Dream" is composed by Denis Seo, Sophia Pae, and Chu herself. She also contributed as a lyricist for both Korean and English versions. "Falling Star" is a collaboration project by Chu and Kim Min-ju, an Urban Works Entertainment trainee and former member of the Korean-Japanese girl group Iz*One. This is her first highlight project unit with a fellow company trainee entitled Project Diary. In September, Chu also made an appearance as the leading girl in the music video of Hoya's single, "Baby U".

In April 2019, she contributed to the Welcome to Waikiki 2 OST with "Delight". Chu later contributed to the Home for Summer OST with "A Thousand Days' Love" in August 2019. In October 2019, she debuted as an actress through the web series Spunk, wherein she portrayed Ari. In the same month, Chu formally released "I Want to See You Tomorrow" for the My Sweet Melody OST, whose music video initially premiered in March 2019.

On January 24, 2020, she starred in the music video of "Count to Three Like a Habit" by KCM. Chu is set to star in the web series Live with a Ghost. She has been attempting to expand her career into China.

Discography

Extended plays

Single albums

Singles

Soundtrack appearances

Filmography

Television shows

Radio programs

Web drama

Footnotes

References

External links

 

1998 births
Living people
Korean-language singers of the United States
Korean-language singers of the Philippines
English-language singers from the Philippines
Filipino expatriates in South Korea
American expatriates in South Korea
Filipino people of Chinese descent
K-pop Star participants
American musicians of Filipino descent
American musicians of Chinese descent
21st-century Filipino women singers
21st-century American women singers
21st-century American singers
American people of Filipino descent
American people of Chinese descent